Adam Briscomb is an Australian actor, best known for his role as Adam Tate in the television soap opera 
Sons and Daughters.

References
 http://www.sonsanddaughters.co.uk/people/castlist/actor_order_1.htm
 https://aso.gov.au/titles/features/dogs-in-space/credits/
 https://www.ausstage.edu.au/pages/contributor/232587

External links
 

Living people
Australian male television actors
Year of birth missing (living people)
Place of birth missing (living people)